The Scottish Government Education and Justice Directorates are a group of  civil service Directorates in the Scottish Government created by a re-organisation.

The individual directorates within the overarching Education and Justice Directorates report to the Director-General, Joe Griffin.

Ministers 
There is a direct relationship between Ministers and the Education and Justice Directorates, although this direct relationship varies across the Government as some DGs do not directly read across to Ministerial portfolios. The activities of the Directorates include those under the purview of the Cabinet Secretary for Justice, Keith Brown MSP and the Cabinet Secretary for Education and Skills, Shirley-Anne Somerville MSP. They are assisted in this work by the Minister for Community Safety, the Minister for Children and Young People and the Minister for Higher Education, Further Education, Youth Employment and Training.

Directorates
The overarching Scottish Government Directorates were preceded by similar structures called "Departments" that no longer exist (although the word is still sometimes used in this context). As an overarching family of Directorates, the Learning and Justice Directorates incorporate the following individual Directorates:

 Advanced Learning and Science Directorate
 Children and Families Directorate
 Early Learning and Childcare Directorate
 Justice Directorate
 Learning Directorate
 Safer Communities Directorate

Agencies and other bodies
The Directorates are responsible for various non-departmental public bodies.

 Disclosure Scotland
 Education Scotland
 Registers of Scotland
 Scottish Courts and Tribunals Service
 Scottish Prison Service
 Scottish Housing Regulator
 Student Awards Agency for Scotland

References

External links
 Directorates on Scottish Government website

Directorates of the Scottish Government
2010 establishments in Scotland
2010 in British politics
Scotland
Scotland